Paticiola is a monotypic snout moth genus in the subfamily Phycitinae described by Carl Heinrich in 1956. Its only species, Patriciola semicana, was described by the same author in the same year. It is known from North America, including Utah.

References

Phycitinae
Monotypic moth genera
Moths of North America
Pyralidae genera
Taxa named by Carl Heinrich